Waimoa or Waimaa is a language spoken by about 18,467 (2010 census) people in northeast East Timor. Waimoa proper is reported to be mutually intelligible with neighboring Kairui and Midiki, with 5,000 speakers total.

The classification of Waimoa is unclear. Structurally, it is Malayo-Polynesian. However, its vocabulary is largely Papuan, similar to that of Makasae.  Although generally classified as Austronesian languages or dialects that have been largely relexified under the influence of a language related to Makasae, it is possible that Waimoa, Kairui, and Midiki are instead Papuan languages related to Makasae which have been influenced by Austronesian.

Phonology 

Similarly to other Austronesian languages of the region, Waimoa has aspirated/voiceless and glottalized/ejective consonants, which are distributed like  and  consonant clusters (or perhaps  and ) but are often pronounced as single segments.

Similarly there are voiceless and glottalized . 

There is also vowel harmony.

See also
Kawaimina

References

Timor–Babar languages
Languages of East Timor
Mixed languages